Tripoli Lake may refer to:

Lakes
In Canada:
In Ontario:
Tripoli Lake (Algoma District)
Tripoli Lake (Kenora District, Ontario)

See also
West Tripoli Lake (Ontario)